Jerry Smith may refer to:

 Jerry Edwin Smith (born 1946), American federal appellate judge
 Jerry Smith (tight end) (1943–1986), American football tight end
 Jerry Smith (American football coach) (1930–2011), American football coach
 Jerry Smith (basketball, born 1941), American basketball player who played collegiately at Furman
 Jerry Smith (basketball, born 1987), American basketball player
 Jerry L. Smith (1943–2015), American lawyer and politician
 Jerry Smith (golfer) (born 1964), American professional golfer
 Jerry Smith (martial artist), former professional full-contact fighting coach
 Jerry Smith (soccer coach) (born 1960), American soccer coach
 Jerry Smith (Rick and Morty), a fictional character in the American animated series Rick and Morty

See also
 Gerry Smyth (born 1961), Irish academic and musician
 Gerry Smith (born 1939), English footballer
 Gerald Smith (disambiguation)
 Gerard Smith (disambiguation)
 Jeremy Smith (disambiguation)
 Jeremiah Smith (disambiguation)